Caveman is an American indie rock band based in Brooklyn, New York. The band recorded their first studio album in 2011.  Although originally self-released, the album was re-released by Fat Possum Records in 2012.  Caveman performed at SXSW 2013 and Sasquatch Festival 2013. The band's musical style is a mixture of indie rock and indie pop. Caveman also performed at the Bonnaroo 2014 Arts and Music Festival. 

The video for the song "In the City" features actress Julia Stiles.

Studio albums
CoCo Beware - self-released in 2011, re-released by Fat Possum Records (2012)
Caveman (2013) Engineered and Mixed by Albert Di Fiore
Otero War (June 2016) Produced and Engineered by Albert Di Fiore
Smash (July 2021)

References

External links

record label site
NPR first listen

Musical groups from Brooklyn
Indie pop groups from New York (state)
Fat Possum Records artists